Kapamilya, Deal or No Deal is the Philippine franchise of Deal or No Deal, presently hosted by Luis Manzano and previously by Kris Aquino, which premiered on June 5, 2006, on ABS-CBN.

The smallest prize has always been ₱1, but the grand prize has always varied; at present, the top prize is ₱1,000,000. The game show's tagline is "Ang Kapalaran mo, Desisyon Mo" which in turn translates in English as "Your Fate, [is] Your Decision." At the time of its premiere, this was the first weekday primetime game show in the Philippines since the so-called primetime game show craze died down in late 2002, with Pilipinas, Game KNB?, the last remaining show among the weekday primetime game shows, reformatted into a daytime one after a relatively brief hiatus (although it had a primetime spinoff called Pasko Na, Game KNB? for three weeks in December 2005 to January 2006).

The first season of the show was supposed to be a three-month stint, to give way to another Endemol-produced program Pinoy Dream Academy, but its immense popularity caused the show to be extended to a nine-month-long season. The second season premiered in June 2007, and was supposed to end in October of the same year. Once again, the show's success amongst viewers resulted in an extended season, a new time slot, and lead programming for the evening news; the season concluded in January 2008. After a six-month hiatus, the third season of the show premiered in July 2008, and became the first to also be broadcast on TFC's North American feed. The original series of the program ended on March 27, 2009.

After a nearly two-year hiatus, the show returned On February 25, 2012, with Luis Manzano as host. Original presenter Kris Aquino further elaborated that she could not host the show as she was having earlier & upcoming commitments with Kris TV & taping conflicts with Kailangan Ko'y Ikaw. Considered as a continuation of the original series, this fourth season lasted until September 28, 2013, and had noticeable changes in game play, and in scheduling, airing only on Saturdays, as opposed to weekdays like the previous three seasons. The fifth season of the show premiered on February 9, 2015, after numerous teasers hinting of the show's return, with further changes to game play (to be mentioned below). On January 25, 2016, Kapamilya, Deal or No Deal become Barangay edition. The fifth season ended on March 4, 2016.

Overview

Gameplay
The Philippine version is very similar to the U.S. version of Deal or No Deal (including the logo), except for the sounds and musical scoring which were adapted from the Dutch version.

Before the game proper begins, a third party randomly places the possible amount of prize in the briefcases, which are distributed to 26 identically dressed models (called the 26K) who reveal the contents during the game. No one, including the host, knows what amounts are in the cases. Each contestant receives a new, randomly assigned set of cases. The prizes range in amounts from ₱1 to a varying top prize; the first season had a top prize of ₱2,000,000.

After picking a case, the contestant then selects six of the remaining 25 cases, revealed one at a time. This is followed by a "phone call" by "The Banker", a mysterious figure whose face is not shown (at times a silhouette can be seen). He purportedly sits in a skybox (situated between the two audience sections) and makes an offer, via telephone to the host (his voice is never heard) to buy the contestant's case, loosely based on the mean of the cash amounts still in play, and also based on the player's psychology. The player is then asked by Kris (or Luis) the title question: "Deal or No Deal?"

Should the contestant refuse the offer (by stating "No Deal!"), they must choose five of the remaining cases to eliminate from consideration. The Banker makes another offer, and the game continues as before, with the player choosing one less briefcase than the round before (i.e, four, then three, then two, then one case at a time until two briefcases remain). The Banker's offer may be higher or lower than the previous offer depending on the round's gameplay (i.e., if a top prize is eliminated, generally the offer decreases; conversely, if lower amounts are eliminated, the offer increases significantly).

The contestant is shown a button that is revealed underneath a Plexiglas lid to press in case the contestant takes the banker's offer. When asked the question, the player must either press the button to accept the Banker's offer (Deal) or shut the lid to refuse it (No Deal).

If the contestant decides to Deal, the game ends and they win whatever the Banker offered them. If the contestant says No Deal to every offer the Banker makes, they win whatever is in their briefcase. 

Each contestant has several supporters (usually three or four), who sit in a special section just off stage during his/her game. As the field of briefcases dwindles, one or more of the supporters are asked to consult with the contestant and help them make a decision. These exchanges have become emotional, particularly when very high and very small amounts remained and the Banker offers a large cash buyout. The contestant's supporters are typically revealed after the second Bank deal and before the third round; although if a contestant is doing well, the host will let the game run its course for some time, often only consulting the supporters when the tide begins to turn.

Players who say Deal to the Banker's offer are often given the chance to play out the game entirely at no risk to them to see if they had made the right choice in accepting. Hypothetical offers are also displayed to see if they could have won a better deal from the Banker or if their offer was the best.

Contestants who joined through text messaging are selected and screened with a series of interviews and tests, including a psychological one, before they appear on the show.

Gameplay changes
In the fourth season, upon Luis Manzano assuming hosting duties, the 26K became the 24K. As a result, the number of briefcases opened in each round was also modified, starting from five in the first round, three in each of the next three rounds, two in each the next three rounds, and one in each the final two rounds. Gameplay otherwise remains the same, with the exception of a routine option to swap briefcases in the end. The offer to swap briefcases was only given one time during Aquino's tenure.

In the fifth season, the briefcases were reduced once again from 24 to 20. For the very first time in this season and for this franchise, celebrities were the ones to hold the briefcases and a roulette was used to determine who among the 20 Lucky Stars would be the player of the day. Everyone would have a chance to play, since their tenure as briefcase holders lasted for a month, and they would be replaced by a new batch of celebrities every month. The number of briefcases opened in each round was similar to the original run in Seasons 1 to 4, but five cases were opened first, then four, three, two until one case is opened in succeeding rounds. Since the celebrity player of the day is also part of the 20 Lucky Stars, so after each star's situated briefcase is opened, they would sit in the audience space provided with a special platform row and would help the player in case if he/she has a difficult time during case selection at gameplay, thus eliminating the supporters' area of the studio. Generally, the celebrity's designated briefcase as a Lucky Star would be their briefcase for play once chosen. However, the celebrity contestant had the option of swapping for a different briefcase, in which case the original holder of the new briefcase in play would then hold the swapped briefcase for the duration of play, then regain their designated briefcase in the next game.

Case values
The currency of the amounts on the money board, on the briefcases, and offered by the Banker to the contestants is in Philippine pesos. Throughout the show, the peso sign is never used in all of the amounts on the money board, on the briefcases, and offers by the Banker to the contestants. It is because of the limited font and/or character support for the actual peso sign (₱).

On January 1, 2007, the ₱2,500 and ₱5,000 case values were replaced by the ₱75,000 and the ₱4,000,000 case values (the latter being the highest amount). On its second season, ₱2,500 and ₱5,000 came back in the board and new amounts like ₱250 and ₱250,000 appeared replacing the amounts, ₱750, ₱200,000, ₱300,000 and ₱400,000 of the first season together with the top amount of the season which is the ₱3,000,000.

The briefcase amounts reverted to the original ones for the third season. But later in the third season, the five highest values were replaced with ₱1,000,000 each, similar to the Million Dollar Missions of the American version.

On January 5, 2009, the case values for the ₱4M Edition were brought back into play at par with the new year.

For the fourth season, the ₱150 and ₱2,500 case values were removed. In replacement, this season introduced a special prize hidden in one of the briefcases. If a contestant opens this briefcase during the game, he/she will win this guaranteed special prize in favor of normally opening its case value afterwards. The Christmas Edition returned on December 1, 2012, with the ₱400 and ₱750 cases replaced with two more ₱300,000 into play. From February 23, 2013, to March 23, 2013, the ₱750 case was replaced with one more ₱1,000,000 for celebrating the first anniversary of the season.

For the fifth season, the ₱75, ₱750, ₱25,000, and the ₱2,000,000 were removed. Only the ₱1,000,000 was maintained, since this has been a common win for those who have been millionaires of the show. This board is also significant since this is the one with least total amount, over the past four seasons.

1st & 3rd Seasons
<div style="float:left; width:180px;">

2nd Season
<div style="float:left; width:180px;">

4th Season
<div style="float:left; width:180px;">

5th Season

4M Edition (1st & 3rd Seasons)
<div style="float:left; width:260px;">

3rd Season Christmas Edition
<div style="float:left; width:250px;">

4th Season Christmas Edition
<div style="float:left; width:250px;">

NBC Around The World
<div style="float:left; width:250px;">

The sums of the briefcase values are:
Seasons 1 and 3: PHP4,596,066
Season 2: PHP7,020,566
Season 4: PHP4,593,416
Season 5: PHP2,567,591
4M Edition: PHP8,663,566
Season 3 Christmas Edition: PHP5,396,066
Season 4 Christmas Edition: PHP5,192,266
Season 4 1st Anniversary Edition: PHP5,592,666

Changes

Second season changes
Aside from the revamp of the money board in the second season, set designs were changed.
The podium where the button was found has been modified. The button itself now resembles a siren (except it itself does not make a sound until pressed). It looked like a sink and also lights up whenever the phone rings.
The landscape behind the 26K had been changed from a night cityscape to a sunset scene with columns. The staircase where the 26K stand also had columns and two more flights of stairs. Because of this, the models could appear from behind and at the side of the staircase.
The entrance of the 26K whenever Kris asked them to bring down the cases changed. The 26K theme was modified and became longer. There was also choreography included aside from the typical modeling entrance of the girls. The audience also clapped along with the entrance of the girls.
There was a bridge connecting from the Banker's skybox. It bore the show's logo. The bridge still exists in the succeeding seasons.
The money board now had an illuminated frame.
The telephone resembled the one used in the US version, only she placed the phone buttons-down. It had a pyramid-shaped base and a disc below the base which lights up like the podium.
The vault door was nowhere to be found. Instead, Kris comes out from a room at the back of the set.
The section for the player's companions was a metal bench.
The staircase was much higher than it used to be.
The theme color of the set was red (in contrast to black/gray in the first season).
As the show ended, ten girls entered from the back of the staircase and wave at the audience in silhouette.
When smaller amount (ex. ₱1, ₱5, ₱10, ₱25) was revealed or open from the briefcase, dance music was played by the DJ.

Third season changes
While the money board reverted to the first-season values, there were also many changes applied for the third season:
The steps on which the 26K stand became larger with the background changed to a futuristic night skyline and simple boards replacing the pillars.
The music accompanying the 26K's entrance has also been altered to a more electronic sound. Meanwhile, a brass band, dubbed "Ang Parokya ni Banker" (Banker's Parish) (derived from the name of the band Parokya ni Edgar) has been added to provide additional music, especially whenever a seven-digit amount is revealed. Along with the band are majorettes, who mock the contestant by saying "Ubos na" ("All gone") when both seven-digit figures have been revealed.
When the small amounts are revealed and open, the majorettes of Parokya ni Banker were dancing along with the music playing by the DJ.
The stage itself is also considerably smaller and more circular.
The podium where the contestant stands is considerably smaller, even resembling a moped's front end. The Deal button and the telephone used in the second season are still being used.
The section for the player's companions is a circular couch. Furthermore, there is a retractable bridge under the area which connects it with the main stage. The bridge appears whenever the companions enter the studio through a pair of sliding doors behind the couch after being called in by the host (in previous seasons, the contestant's companions are already seated by the time they are introduced).
The main theme color of the set has been reverted to black/gray, but the gold rectangles for the briefcase values, the Banker's offer, and even the show's logo are now made with a shiny background.
While the small monitor behind the contestant (and under the Banker's window) is retained, a third display monitor has been added beside the Banker's skybox. Its function is the same as the aforementioned smaller monitor: show the Banker's current offer. Sometimes, during the beginning of the show and in between offers, random images appear in the said third monitor.
A camera is placed behind the Banker, bounded by acrylic glass.
The contestant now enters from a single set of doors from the back of the studio; Kris entered from the same doors during the first few episodes of the third season, but later resorted to appear on stage from the start. This set of doors is different from the one behind the companions' area mentioned earlier.
The DJ of the show stills play some dance music when the small amounts are opened like in the previous season.

Fourth season changes
The main theme color for the whole studio is dark midnight blue. This makes a new dramatic feel that contrast to previous seasons which had a lighter tone. The audience is more camouflaged behind the dark colors.
The steps of the 24K are sleeker and wider.
The stage is noticeably less circular, similar to the stage used in season two.
The landscape behind the 24K is now a simple layer of strings not like the past seasons.
The flights of the staircase for the 24K have a light of blue color.
The briefcases are now in black color and the numbers are white.
The host will call on the contestant with his/her companions then the host will call on the 24K. In past seasons, the 26K would be called first before the contestant.
The telephone resembles a back-to-basics rotary dial red telephone similarly used in other franchised countries, particularly the British edition, although it is cordless like the previous telephones used in the show. The style is to take into account that the new Banker is the hat-wearing "father" of previous Banker, informally called "Banker Sr."
The glass cover for Deal Button is now bigger than the previous seasons. 
The Eurostile font previously used in the briefcase values and the displayed values on the screens are replaced by Impact and Verdana. Eurostile is still used in the show's television advertisements however.

Fifth season changes
The total briefcases is now 20, instead of 24.
The 26K/24K Girls in the past seasons are no longer part of the new season.
For one two three and four batches of Lucky Stars, a roulette is used in this season, called Gulong ng Tala ("Wheel of Stars," from the name "Lucky Stars") determining who will play among the 20 Lucky Stars, a first on the show.
The telephone was resembled back to the original one, applied in the US show, although its base is symmetrical to the phone itself.
The font of the displayed values has been changed.
20 Lucky Stars (celebrities) are now holding the briefcases, and the former 26K/24K's entrance music was transposed into C Minor and added with Lyrics.
The player of the day will come from the 20 Lucky Stars.
The top prize for this season is PHP1,000,000 (one half of PHP2,000,000).
The banker is female instead of male.
This season is like the Deal or no Deal US Syndicate, except the cases are 20, instead of 22.
The price was distributed to half to the contestant and to the chosen charity.
Animations of graphical elements on video displays of the show have been changed.
It was being Held in a Barangay where the Banker was sat inside at a Barangay OutPost.

Models
Kapamilya, Deal or No Deal features a wide variety of models over the course of its five seasons. The first three seasons featured the 26K girls which, unlike the U.S. counterpart, can handle any case per episode instead of being placed in a permanent position. Its most notable models include Charmel de Asis, who was notorious for holding the high or jackpot amounts and was the Banker's Ace, and Chloe McCulley who went on to compete at the inaugural Miss World Philippines 2011 pageant and placed third to eventual Miss World 2011 1st Runner-up Gwendoline Ruais.

In the fourth season, the show featured a new set of models known as the 24K alluding to the number of cases played per game. The fifth season was the first to feature celebrities as the case models, known as the 20 Lucky Stars, which were done in four batches and are the players of the episode once chosen by the Gulong ng Tala.

Text promos

Kapamilya, Katext
On July 10, 2006, a text-messaging game was introduced as a new segment of the show for the viewers to participate and win cash prizes. In Katext, Deal or No Deal, there are 10 special briefcases with amounts starting from ₱5,000 to ₱50,000, one of which is randomly selected for play. After a briefcase is chosen, 2 briefcases are randomly opened, after which the Banker makes an offer to buy the suitcase in play. Viewers can text whether they want to "Deal", signifying that they accept the banker's offer, or "No Deal", meaning they will accept whatever amount is in the suitcase. In the next episode, the suitcase is opened to reveal the amount it contains. If the amount in the suitcase is lower than the offer, one winner will be selected from those who texted "Deal", with the Banker's offer as the prize. If the amount in the suitcase is higher than the offer, one winner will be selected from those who texted "No Deal" to take home the amount in the suitcase. The winner is chosen each day from those who texted via electronic raffle. The amounts are:

5,000
10,000
15,000
20,000
25,000

30,000
35,000
40,000
45,000
50,000

On November 13, 2006, a segment was made that was named: Kapamilya, Katext, Deal or No Deal. The range of the amounts inside the case still increased by ₱5,000 starting from ₱10,000, but the highest amount inside the case is ₱100,000. Same procedures still apply, but have been modified. On Monday, one briefcase and another has been chosen. The next day after the chosen briefcase has been opened, another briefcase is chosen, and the banker's offer is based on the briefcases already opened the previous day. This new process continues throughout the week. The amounts are:

10,000
15,000
20,000
25,000
30,000

35,000
40,000
45,000
50,000
100,000

Ka-Text, Deal or No Deal
Along with the show's return, a new promo was launched, named after the first text promo Ka-text, Deal or No Deal, wherein home viewers could win half of either what the contestant has won or the contents of the chosen briefcase (i.e. ranging from ₱0.50 to ₱1,500,000). Viewers could text the contestant's possible final response of "Deal" or "No Deal." Texting stopped after the contestant made their final decision. The following day, a winner was chosen from those who texted; if the contestant's final decision was "No Deal," only those who text the same response would win. On the other hand, if the contestant said "Deal," all who texted would be considered, regardless of response; what the winner would receive depended on the response.

In the show's third season, the rules were modified. Viewer could text "Deal" if the accepted offer was larger than the contents of the chosen briefcase or "No Deal" if the briefcase contents is larger than the accepted offer or the Banker's final offer if the contestant decides to say "No Deal" all the way. The correct response would depend on the outcome of the game; only those who text the correct response are eligible for prizes: ₱20,000 for the daily winners or ₱200,000 for the monthly winner. The promo was relaunched later with the same daily prizes, but this time, a Nissan Navara was up for grabs as the grand prize.

Unnamed text promo
In a third promotion, this time using the show's title, viewers were invited to guess which briefcase contained P3,000,000. Those who correctly guessed the said briefcase would win PHP25,000 plus a "nochebuena" package.

Tulong sa Barangay
Prior to the start of the 4 Million Edition, a commercial of the show was released where barangay captains were invited to join and play as studio contestants. The aim of Tulong sa Barangay is to provide help for the needs and developments of different barangays in the Philippines by allowing the barangay captains to play as studio contestants and whatever the barangay captain will get, it will be donated to the barangay funds. A different set of text messaging instructions are given for interested barangay captains. The first episode involving barangay captains began on February 6, 2007.

Kapamilya, Deal or No Deal sa Cebu
On November 30 to December 1, 2007, the show finally made its first out-studio episodes at the parking lot of SM City Cebu. The stage made for the show was noticeably larger, having a larger stage and two large staircases where the models stood. The Banker would stand at the screen behind the staircases obscured by a red clouded background. He only appeared in front of his "helicopter" whenever he made his offer.

The episodes were shown from December 3 to 7 of the same year. One of the contestants happened to be the mayor of Toledo City, Cebu, who played as a regular contestant.

Winners of at least ₱1,000,000

Statistics
Largest amount won: ₱2,000,000 (December 29, 2006; August 6, 2007; September 5, 2007; and February 2, 2009, episodes)
Highest potential offer: ₱2,250,000 (August 6, 2007 episode)
Highest banker's offer accepted: ₱1,600,000 (February 16, 2009 episode)

Parodies
Toni Gonzaga of Gudtaym (a sitcom previously aired on the same network) hosted "Kapamilya Meal or No Meal," which was a parody of the show. Filipinos from low income brackets were invited to the studio to play for the meal they wish to eat. The contestants were literally not given dinner to eat before the game. In the pilot episode, the contestant won and got to eat tuyo (dried fish). The prizes were lechon (roasted pig) with PHP6,000, tinolang manok (stewed chicken soup) with PHP3,000, adobong daga (rat stewed with soy sauce), tuyo (dried fish) and asin (salt).
Wazzup Wazzup of Studio 23 (owned by the same network) also came up with a parody dating segment titled "Kazupista, Feel or No Feel". There is also a similarly named segment of TV5's Lokomoko High named "Feel or No Feel," but this time involving underwear.
TV5's Wow Maling Mali, hosted by Joey de Leon, impersonating Kris Aquino, made a spoof named "Kabaranggay, Beer or No Beer", with some males as the crossdressing version of the (less than) 26K, and a go go dancing-Banker in a covered cage, offering beer in exchange with the briefcases.
John En Shirley, a sitcom aired on the same network, featured an episode where one of the title characters, John H. Puruntong (portrayed by Philippine Comedy King Dolphy) played as a contestant of the game show. The episode was aired on September 16, 2006. John fought for his briefcase until the end, refusing the banker's offer of PHP101,000. His briefcase contained PHP200,000, while the other remaining briefcase contained PHP1.
When the Commission on Elections opened the filing of candidacy for the midterm senatorial elections in the Philippines last January 15, 2007, several individuals applied for candidacy, even those that are considered nuisance candidates like a certain Daniel Magtira who introduced himself as Kris Aquino's husband. After two days, a certain Julieto Esmeralda Sr., who claims to be both a pastor and a businessman, filed his candidacy referring to himself as Mr. Deal signifying his aiming of building a culture of optimism to prevail among Filipinos. He was quoted on National TV saying "“I want people to know that the answer to everything is always ‘deal’, walang laban o bawi, always ‘deal’," referring to the Laban o Bawi segment of GMA-7's Eat Bulaga!.
Noynoy Aquino, Kris Aquino's brother and a senatorial candidate for the 2007 Philippine Midterm Elections, released a "Deal or No Deal" inspired political advertisement for television. In the commercial, Kris recalled how strict Noynoy was as well as how hard he struggled to take care of the family as requested by their father Ninoy Aquino prior to their father's assassination. Kris even made a "Deal" pose and catchphrase in the last part of the commercial, signifying her way of convincing the voters to vote for him. Ironically, Noynoy's response to Kris in the ad was "Ayos, Game Na", inspired from the catchphrase of Kris Aquino's game show Pilipinas, Game KNB?. Noynoy won the senate race and landed on the 6th out of 12 slots.
On the October 12, 2007 episode, McDonald's Philippines launched its advertisement featuring Kris Aquino playing "Meal or No Meal" over the counter with a McDonald's cashier. The McDonald's crew featured in the commercial were holding trays instead of briefcases containing the "value meals" that can be selected by patrons of the fast food chain. The restaurant chain also had a raffle promotion in which its winner eventually played in the show.

Criticisms
Philippine Daily Inquirer columnist Nestor U. Torre expressed disappointment on the show because it is not "all that spellbinding and empathetic" since the briefcase a contestant has chosen would keep it to the end (contrary to some versions which exchanging briefcases is allowed). Also, he pointed out that the format of the show limited Aquino's effectivity as a host.
In his January 18, 2007 column, Nestor U. Torre expressed that the game show makes it so difficult for its players to win big because it's based on sheer luck, with a player's fate being sealed by the choice he makes of a particular briefcase to place his hopes on at the start of the game. He cited that another major factor that reduces players’ winnings is the “greed” motive that pushes contestants to reject already substantial deals from the show's resident “banker,” because they want to make even more money by pushing the game into the next round. However, Torre does recognize that subsequent contestants were the first to benefit from the game show's beefed-up top prize and will bring new excitement in everyone involved—the contestants, the studio audience, and the host. He mentioned that the move to double the game's pot sets the show apart from other game programs, many of which offer a couple of million pesos in potential top winnings. With its P4 million pot for the 2007 run of the first season, he pointed out that it is now the best game show to beat.
The July 14, 2006 episode featuring psychic Rene Mariano became controversial when the host complimented Rene's abilities because the latter predicted the end of the career of Hero Angeles, Star Circle Quest grand champion, at Morning Girls with Kris and Korina (previously aired on the same network). Hero and his brother reacted at GMA-7's Startalk saying that the host's remarks were unnecessary and foul.

World Tour U.S. episode 
In April 2008, the U.S. version of Deal or No Deal filmed an episode from the studio of the Filipino version, as part of a series of "World Tour" episodes showcasting international entries in the franchise. The episode was conducted in a similar manner to the U.S. version of the format, featuring an American contestant and prizes in U.S. dollars. Kris Aquino joined U.S. host Howie Mandel as co-host. The episode premiered on NBC in the U.S. on May 5, 2008, and aired on ABS-CBN on June 22; although it was actually the last of the "World Tour" episodes to actually be filmed (the first was filmed from the Estonian version Võta või jäta),  ABS-CBN business unit head Alou Almaden stated that Endemol USA "loved the episode so much" that it was aired first instead.

ABS-CBN's PR campaign for that event also earned the show a Philippine Quill Award of Merit in the same year.

Reception
Kapamilya, Deal or No Deal has been consistently topping on its timeslot. Season 4 posted its highest rating to date. On October 6, 2012, the show garnered 32.7% rating nationwide. Vice Ganda played in that top rating episode beating the September 13, 2012's 30.9%.

See also
List of programs broadcast by ABS-CBN
List of shows previously aired by ABS-CBN

References

External links

Deal or No Deal
Philippine game shows
ABS-CBN original programming
2006 Philippine television series debuts
2016 Philippine television series endings
Philippine television series based on Dutch television series
Filipino-language television shows